The City of Tshwane is the single-largest metropolitan municipality in the country, comprising seven regions, 107 wards and 210 councillors. Wards are delimited by the Municipal Demarcation Board (MDB). This entails the division of the whole geographic area of a municipality into smaller geographic areas, called wards. Schedule 1 to the Structures Act, 1998 provides for certain procedures and criteria to which the MDB must comply. The MDB must, amongst others, ensure that all wards in a municipality have approximately the same number of voters. The number of registered voters in each ward, may not vary by more than 15% from the norm (average). Thus there may not be a correlation between wards, neighborhoods, areas and suburbs. The seven regions are:

Region 1 – Soshanguve, Mabopane, Winterveld, Ga-Rankuwa and Pretoria North

Region 2 - Wonderboom, Sinoville, Montana, Temba, Hammanskraal

Region 3 – Pretoria CBD, Brooklyn, Hatfield and Pretoria West

Region 4 - Centurion, Irene and surrounds

Region 5 - Rayton, Roodeplaat, Cullinan

Region 6 – Pretoria East, Eersterust, Mamelodi, Shere

Region 7 - Bronkhorstspruit and surrounds

The wards in the regions are demarcated according to the number of voters.

This is a list of suburbs in the City of Tshwane Metropolitan Municipality, which includes the city of Pretoria and its surrounding suburbs and exurbs. Pretoria/Tshwane is divided into 7 regions namely Pretoria North, Far North, Central Western, Southern, Pretoria Far East, Eastern, Bronkhorstspruit. Region 3 not only include Pretoria CBD, Brooklyn, Hatfield but also the Moot area and Pretoria West. Both Moot and Pretoria West are listed separately below. Just to add to the confusion, City of Tshwane Maps and GIS  refer to Townships rather than Suburbs. The City of Tshwane is the second largest municipality in Gauteng and is among the six biggest metropolitan municipalities in South Africa. The following towns and townships form part of the Municipality's area: Pretoria, Centurion, Akasia, Soshanguve, Mabopane, Atteridgeville, Ga-Rankuwa, Winterveld, Hammanskraal, Temba, Pienaarsrivier, Crocodile River and Mamelodi. A township may also have more than one extension.

Pretoria East

 Boardwalk
 Bronberg
 Brummeria
 Clearwater Flyfishing Estate
 Constantia Park
 Die Wilgers
 Elarduspark
 Equestria
 Erasmuskloof
 Faerie Glen
Glenwood 
 Garsfontein
 Hazeldean (Silverlakes Surroundings)
 La Montagne
 Leeuwenhof Estate
 Lombardy Estate
 Lydiana
 Lynnwood Glen
 Lynnwood Manor
 Lynnwood Ridge
 Menlyn
 Meyerspark
 Mooikloof
 Moreleta Park
 Murrayfield
 Newlands
 Newmark Estate
 Olympus
 Olympus Country Estate
 Pretorius Park
 Rietvalleipark
 Rietvalleirand
 Savannah Country Estate
 Shere
 Silver Lakes Golf Estate
 Silver Stream
 Silverton
 Silverwoods Country Estate
 Six Fountains Estate
 The Meadows
 The Meadows at Hazeldean
 The Ridge Estate
 The Wilds
 Tijger Valley and surrounds
 Val de Grace
 Watloo
 Wapadrand
 Waterkloof Glen
 Weavind Park
 Welbekend 
 Willow Acres
 Willow Glen
 Willow Park Manor
 Wingate Park
The blyde riverwalk estate

Moot 

 Colbyn
 Gezina
 Kilner Park
 Moregloed
 Queenswood
 Rietfontein
 Rietondale
 Riviera
 Villieria
 Waverley
 Wonderboom South

Pretoria North

 Akasia
 Amandasig
 Annlin
 Chantelle
 Clarina
 Dorandia
 Eldorette
 Eloffsdal
 Florauna
 Ga-rankuwa
 Heatherdale
 Heatherview
 Hesteapark
 Karen Park
 Klerksoord
 LesMarais
 Mabopane
 Magalieskruin
 Mayville
 Montana
 Montana Gardens
 Montana Park
 Ninapark
 Onderstepoort
 Parktown Estate
 Pretoria North
 Roseville
 Rosslyn
 Sinoville
 Soshanguve
 Strydfontein and surrounds
 The Orchards
 Theresa Park
 Tileba
 Wolmer
 Wonderboom
 Zambezi Country Estate

Pretoria West

 Andeon AH
 Atteridgeville
 Booysens
 Claremont
 Danville
 Daspoort
 Elandspoort
 Hermanstad
 Kameeldrift West
 Kirkney
 Kwaggasrand
 Lotus Gardens
 Mountain View
 Philip Nel Park
 Pretoria Gardens
 Pretoria West
 Proclamation Hill
 Suiderberg
 Wespark

Pretoria Old East

 Alphen Park
 Arcadia
 Ashlea Gardens
 Baileys Muckleneuk
 Berea
 Brooklyn 
 Clydesdale
 Eastwood
 Erasmus Park
 Erasmusrand
 Groenkloof
 Hatfield
 Hazelwood
 Hillcrest 
 Lukasrand
 Lynnwood 
 Maroelana
 Menlo Park 
 Monument Park
 Muckleneuk
 Pretoria Central
 Sterrewag
 Sunnyside
 Waterkloof
 Waterkloof Heights
 Waterkloof Park
 Waterkloof Ridge

Pretoria Far North 

 Boekenhoutskloof and surrounds
 Boekenhoutskloofdrif
 Bon Accord
 Buffelsdrift AH
 Bultfontein AH
 Cynthia Vale AH
 De Wagendrif
 Dinokeng
 Doornpoort and surrounds
 Grootvlei
 Hammanskraal
 Honingnestkrans
 Pyramid
 Rooiwal
 Temba
 Wallmannsthal
 Waterval
 Welgevonden and surrounds

Pretoria Far East 

 Bashewa
 Boschkop
 Bronkhorstspruit
 Country View Estate
 Cullinan and Surrounds
 Derdepoort
 Donkerhoek
 Doornkloof
 Elandshoek
 Grootfontein Estate
 Kameel Zyn Kraal
 Kameeldrift
 Kameeldrift East
 Kameelfontein and surrounds
 Kleinfontein
 Klipkop
 Krokodilspruit
 Leeuwfontein
 Lindopark
 Mooikloof Country Residences
 Mooikloof Equestrian Estate
 Mooikloof Gardens
 Mooikloof Glen
 Mooikloof Heights
 Mooikloof Ridge
 Mooiplaats AH
 Pebble Rock
 Pienaarspoort
 Rayton
 Rietfontein
 Rietvlei View
 Roodeplaat
 Rynoue
 Sable Hills Waterfront Estate
 The Hills
 Tierpoort
Zambezi Manor  Lifestyle Estate

Pretoria South (Region 4) Centurion, Irene, Olievenhoutbosch and surrounds 
To be updated

References 

http://www.tshwane.gov.za/sites/about_tshwane/MapsAndGIS/Pages/Tshwane-Geographic-Information-and-Aerial-Photos.aspx

External links 
 - Tshwane GIS and Maps

Lists
Pretoria
Suburbs